Wiewiórki may refer to the following places:
Wiewiórki, Kuyavian-Pomeranian Voivodeship (north-central Poland)
Wiewiórki, Warmian-Masurian Voivodeship (north Poland)
Wiewiórki, West Pomeranian Voivodeship (north-west Poland)